Leeroy Poulter (born 1981) is a Toyota racing team driver who has made his first appearance on Motor-Sport in the year 2014.

Early Years 
Leeroy was born in Johannesburg, South Africa on 6 March 1981 and started his love of motorcross at the age of six. He turned to karting at the age of 16 years, and began to be known both nationally and at the  European karting championship.

Dakar career 
Poulter first competed in the Dakar Rally in 2014.

Leeroy Poulter is noted throughout his career for being ambitious to be in the top 5 since he started participating in the race. He always made sure not to be carried away by other competitors, in that way he always strived for top 5.  Poulter is a defending South African cross country racing champion, having won the title with one round to spare in 2015, and following up with a second title in 2016. He has packed three decades of motorsport into his life, starting with motor-cross in the late 1980s, Since then he has been active in local and global karting championships, raced production cars on the track and won multiple championships. He also won the 2016 South African National Rally Championship for Toyota Gazoo Racing SA, and competes in the Dakar Rally for the same team. In 2016 he finished in the fifth place overall, and currently leads FIA in the South African championship.

Gallery

References 

South African rally drivers
South African racing drivers
1981 births
Off-road racing drivers
Living people
Dakar Rally winning drivers
Dakar Rally drivers